Metisella is a genus of skippers, commonly called sylphs, in the family Hesperiidae found in Africa. For other sylphs see genera Astictopterus, Willema, and Tsitana.

Species
Metisella abdeli (Krüger, 1928)
Metisella aegipan (Trimen, 1868) – mountain sylph
Metisella alticola (Aurivillius, 1925)
Metisella congdoni de Jong & Kielland, 1983
Metisella decipiens (Butler, 1896)
Metisella kakamega de Jong, 1976 – Kakamega sylph
Metisella kambove (Neave, 1910)
Metisella malgacha (Boisduval, 1833) – grassveld sylph
Metisella medea Evans, 1937
Metisella meninx (Trimen, 1873) – marsh sylph
Metisella metis (Linnaeus, 1764) – gold spotted sylph
Metisella midas (Butler, 1894) – Midas sylph
Metisella quadrisignatus (Butler, 1894) – four-spot sylph
Metisella syrinx (Trimen, 1868) – bamboo sylph
Metisella trisignatus (Neave, 1904) – three-spot sylph

Former species
 Metisella angolana (Karsch, 1896). Transferred to Willema angolana (Karsch, 1896)
 Metisella carsoni (Butler, 1898). Transferred to Willema carsoni (Butler, 1898)
 Metisella formosus (Butler, 1894) – beautiful sylph. Transferred to Willema formosa (Butler, 1894)
 Metisella kumbona Evans, 1937. Transferred to Willema kumbona (Evans, 1937)
 Metisella perexcellens (Butler, 1896). Transferred to Willema perexcellens (Butler, 1896)
 Metisella tsadicus (Aurivillius, 1905). Transferred to Willema tsadica (Aurivillius, 1905)
 Metisella willemi (Wallengren, 1857) – netted sylph. Transferred to Willema willemi (Wallengren, 1857)

References

Natural History Museum Lepidoptera genus database
Metisella at funet

Heteropterinae
Hesperiidae genera